Franz Ritter von Hauer, or Franz von Hauer (January 30, 1822 – March 20, 1899), was an Austrian geologist.

Biography
Hauer was born in Vienna,  the son of Joseph von Hauer (1778-1863), who was equally distinguished as a high Austrian official and authority on finance and as a palaeontologist.

He  studied geology at the mining academy of Schemnitz (1839-1843), and for a time was engaged in official mining work in Styria. In 1846, he became assistant to Wilhelm von Haidinger at the mineralogical museum in Vienna; three years later he joined the imperial geological institute, and in 1866 he was appointed director. In 1886, he became superintendent of the Imperial Natural History Museum in Vienna.

Among his special geological works are those on the Cephalopoda of the Triassic and Jurassic formations of Alpine regions (1855-1856). he recognized and discovered 89 species and established the Middle and Late Triassic stratigraphical units of deep shelf environments. His most important general work was that of the Geological Map of Austro-Hungary, in twelve sheets (1867-1871; 4th ed. 1884, including Bosnia and Montenegro). This map was accompanied by a series of explanatory pamphlets.

In 1874, he was elected as a member to the American Philosophical Society. In 1882, he was awarded the Wollaston medal by the Geological Society of London. He was also elected as the foreign correspondent of the Geological Society of London. In 1892, von Hauer became a life-member of the upper house (Herrenhaus) of the Austrian parliament.

The mineral Hauerite is named after the two von Hauers.

Notes

Publications
Beiträge die Paläontolographie von Österreich (1858-1859)
Die Geologie und ihre Anwendung auf die Kenntnis der Bodenbeschaffenheit der Österr.-Ungar. Monarchie (1875; ed. 2, 1878).

References

  This work in turn cites:
 Memoir by Dr. F. Tietze
 Jahrbuch der K. K. geolog. Reichsanstalt (1899, reprinted 1900, with portrait)

1822 births
1899 deaths
Scientists from Vienna
Austrian knights
19th-century Austrian geologists
Wollaston Medal winners